"If Jesus Was a Rockstar" is a song by German singer Kim Petras, released as the lead single from her upcoming album on 11 November 2022 through Amigo and Republic Records. It was written by Petras, Ilya Salmanzadeh, Savan Kotecha, Max Martin, Omer Fedi and Peter Svensson, with Ilya, Martin and Fedi serving as producers. The song serves as the follow-up to Petras' collaboration with Sam Smith, the worldwide number one "Unholy".

Background and recording
Petras expected to write the song with just Savan Kotecha and Ilya, but Max Martin was also present when she met with the writers, and he ended up co-writing and producing the song as well as providing backing vocals on it. Petras and the three "talked about the song" then tried out things "to see what stuck".

The song was described as "guitar-driven" and a "new era" for Petras, with Petras calling it "fun" but "also really lyrically intense", as it was written after she "struggled with her spirituality over the [COVID-19] pandemic" and reflected on her feeling "excluded" from religion growing up. Petras also spoke about wanting to "switch things up" from the "gay club music" she had become known for and "sing about something deeply meaningful, something that I struggle with and something that is just honest".

Petras elaborated that "the song kinda says maybe if religion was cooler, then I would wanna be a part of it. So, if Jesus was a rockstar, maybe I'd want to be just like him."

Promotion
Petras first revealed the song on TikTok in September 2022, before revealing the release date on social media on 1 November.

Charts

References

2022 singles
2022 songs
Kim Petras songs
Song recordings produced by Ilya Salmanzadeh
Song recordings produced by Max Martin
Song recordings produced by Omer Fedi
Songs about Jesus
Songs written by Ilya Salmanzadeh
Songs written by Kim Petras
Songs written by Max Martin
Songs written by Omer Fedi
Songs written by Peter Svensson
Songs written by Savan Kotecha